The voiced labiodental plosive or stop is a consonant sound produced like a , but with the lower lip contacting the upper teeth, as in . A separate symbol that is sometimes seen, especially in Bantu linguistics, but not recognized by the IPA, is the db ligature .

The voiced labiodental plosive is not known to be phonemic in any language. However, it does occur allophonically: 

In the Austronesian language Sika, this sound occurs as an allophone of the labiodental flap in careful pronunciation.

Features

Features of the "voiced labiodental stop":

Occurrence

Notes

References

External links
 

Labiodental consonants
Pulmonic consonants
Voiced oral consonants
Plosives
Central consonants